Mount Fitzsimmons  is a  glacier-clad peak located in the Garibaldi Ranges of the Coast Mountains, in Garibaldi Provincial Park of southwestern British Columbia, Canada. It is the third-highest point of the Fitzsimmons Range, which is a subset of the Garibaldi Ranges. The Diavolo Glacier spreads out below the southeast aspect of the summit, and the Fitzsimmons Glacier descends the northwest slopes. Precipitation runoff from the peak and meltwater from its glaciers drains into tributaries of the Cheakamus River. The first ascent of the mountain was made on August 19, 1924, by a party of the British Columbia Mountaineering Club. The peak was named for prospector James Fitzsimmons, who built a trail along Fitzsimmons Creek in an effort to haul supplies to a small copper mine he staked and worked. The mountain's name was officially adopted on September 2, 1930, by the Geographical Names Board of Canada.

Climate

Based on the Köppen climate classification, Mount Fitzsimmons is located in the marine west coast climate zone of western North America. Most weather fronts originate in the Pacific Ocean, and travel east toward the Coast Mountains where they are forced upward by the range (Orographic lift), causing them to drop their moisture in the form of rain or snowfall. As a result, the Coast Mountains experience high precipitation, especially during the winter months in the form of snowfall. Winter temperatures can drop below −20 °C with wind chill factors below −30 °C. The months July through September offer the most favorable weather for climbing Mount Fitzsimmons.

Climbing Routes
Established climbing routes on Mount Fitzsimmons :
   
 South Face -  First Ascent 1924
 West Ridge -  FA 1964
 North Face -  FA 1981

See also

 Geography of British Columbia
 Geology of British Columbia

References

External links
 Mount Fitzsimmons Weather forecast

Garibaldi Ranges
Two-thousanders of British Columbia
Pacific Ranges
Sea-to-Sky Corridor
New Westminster Land District